The "Kiln" (Kaminos), or "Potters" (Kerameis), is a 23-line hexameter poem that was variously attributed to Homer or Hesiod during antiquity, but is not considered the work of either poet by modern scholars. The poem constitutes an appeal to Athena to grant success to certain unnamed potters if they pay for the poet's song, followed by a series of curses to be enacted should they not reimburse him. It has been included among the Epigrams of Homer, as epigram XIV.

Authorship
Although the "Kiln" is printed among the Hesiodic fragments, there is little reason to assume that it was widely attributed to Hesiod.

The other witnesses to the poem all belong to the Homeric biographical tradition, and it seems that the "Kiln" was composed during the 6th or 5th century BCE as part of a lost work on Homer that predates the surviving texts. According to the pseudo-Herodotean Life of Homer, the great bard was traveling through the eastern Mediterranean and happened to land on the island of Samos. While there he encountered a group of potters who, aware of his fame, offered Homer some of their wares and whatever else that had on hand if he would sing for them. In response, Homer sang the "Kiln".

Synopsis
The poem opens with a dual address to Athena and the poet's audience:

The goddess' potential guardianship is described next: she would make the potter's cups and dishes well-blackened and well-baked, and would make sure that these wares sold for a fair price and in large quantity in the market place, making the potters much profit (lines 3–6). Should the poet not profit as promised, he threatens to "invoke all of the kiln gremlins, Smasher and Crasher, Overblaze and Shakeapart and Underbake, who does this craft [pottery] much harm." Once these gremlins have cast the kiln into confusion and begun wasting the wares, mythological mischief is threatened: Circe will come and harm the potters with her drugs, and Chiron will lead in a host of centaurs to smash kiln and crafts alike (lines 15–20). The poem closes with the poet envisioning himself enjoying the destruction and offers one final curse:

Select editions and translations

Critical editions
 .
 .

Translations
 . (The link is to the 1st edition of 1914.)
 .

Notes

Bibliography
 .
 .
 .

Ancient Greek poems
Hesiod
Homer